Omonike Fowowe is a Nigerian business woman and Chief Executive Officer of Express Multi-Concepts Resources (EMR) Group. In 2020, she was awarded the Younger entrepreneur of the year by ELOY Awards.

Early life 
She is a native of Osun State and an alumna of Airforce Primary School, Christ Redeemers’ Secondary School and Redeemers University where she completed primary, secondary and tertiary education respectively.

Career 
Fowowe is the Chairman of six subsidiaries of EMR Group namely EMR Spaces, the real estate segment of the Group; EMR Marketing; 2-Talent Management; Style My Space, an interior and exterior decoration company; Emah Luxury which handles the gold and luxury accessories segment of the Group; and Theos Luxury which handles construction work on major buildings in Lagos, and renovates residential and commercial buildings. In February 2022, her company EMR marketing services Dubai celebrated her 1 year anniversary.

Recognitions 
She was nominated for the Entrepreneur of the Year award at the 2015 Exquisite Lady of the Year (ELOY) Awards. In recognition of her achievements, Fowowe was awarded “Enterprising Personality of the Year” at the 5th edition of the Nigeria Entrepreneurs Award in 2018. She was also an invited speaker and panelist at the Boundless Hands Africa Initiative for Women and Children’s first Women in Leadership Conference for Young Female Leaders.

References 

Nigerian businesspeople
Living people
Year of birth missing (living people)